The 305 mm howitzer M1939 (Br-18) was a Soviet superheavy siege howitzer used by the Soviet Union during World War II. After the Germans occupied Czechoslovakia in March 1939 they took over the Škoda Works, which had been working on this (Skoda XV) design and a companion 210 mm gun (Skoda VX). After a successful test firing 5 July 1939, as a result of the Molotov–Ribbentrop Pact the Germans sold both designs to the Soviet Union. It is not entirely clear that Skoda actually built the weapons itself or merely supplied the blueprints. At any rate, very few weapons seem to have been built; so few, in fact, that there is no record of the Germans capturing any during Operation Barbarossa.

It used the same carriage as 210 mm gun M1939 (Br-17) as well as the same firing platform and control mechanism. It was transported in three loads.

It was most famously used to defend Leningrad during the siege of Leningrad. The Soviet troops learned that if they fired all of them at the same time and used high-explosive shells, when the rounds exploded at the same time, they would flip over advancing German tanks.

The 305mm would also later appear in the siege of Königsberg (present day Kaliningrad).

References 

World War II artillery of the Soviet Union
305 mm artillery
Artillery of Czechoslovakia
Siege artillery
Howitzers of the Soviet Union
Czechoslovakia–Soviet Union relations
World War II howitzers
Weapons and ammunition introduced in 1940